Hall School may refer to:

Fred P. Hall Elementary School, Maine, US
Hall School Wimbledon, England 
Hall School (Hall, Indiana), US
The Hall School, Hampstead, England